Looks Like Trouble (foaled 7 May 1992) was an Irish-bred, British-trained Thoroughbred racehorse trained by Noel Chance. A specialised Steeplechaser, he raced between February 1997 and June 2003 and won eight of his eighteen races.

In 2000, he was well-fancied for the Cheltenham Gold Cup at the odds of 9–2 and was ridden by Richard Johnson. At the tenth fence, the horse blundered badly and almost lost its complete chance in the race. He eventually went on to win by five lengths. In second was the future King George VI Chase winner Florida Pearl, ridden by Paul Carberry. In fourth was the previous year's Gold Cup winner, See More Business, ridden by Mick Fitzgerald.

After the race was abandoned in 2001, the horse was an unsuccessful favourite for the 2002 Gold Cup.

References

1992 racehorse births
Cheltenham Gold Cup winners
Cheltenham Festival winners
National Hunt racehorses
Thoroughbred family 10-d
Racehorses trained in the United Kingdom
Racehorses bred in Ireland